The black-bibbed tit (Poecile hypermelaenus) is a species of bird in the tit family Paridae. It is found from central and eastern China to southeast Tibet and western Myanmar.

References 

Poecile
Birds of China
Birds described in 1891